Long Lost Father is a 1933 novel by the British writer Gladys Bronwyn Stern. A woman's long-lost wastrel father comes back into her life after many years absence.

Film adaptation
In 1934 it was made into an American film of the same title produced by RKO Pictures. Directed by Ernest B. Schoedsack and starring John Barrymore and Helen Chandler and Alan Mowbray.

References

Bibliography
 Goble, Alan. The Complete Index to Literary Sources in Film. Walter de Gruyter, 1999.
 Watson, George & Willison, Ian R. The New Cambridge Bibliography of English Literature, Volume 4. CUP, 1972.

1933 British novels
Novels set in London
Novels by Gladys Bronwyn Stern
British novels adapted into films
Alfred A. Knopf books